Anglican Diocese of Kumasi  is a Ghanaian diocese of the Church of the Province of West Africa, a member church of the worldwide Anglican Communion. The current bishop is Daniel Sarfo, the current Primate of West Africa.

References

Anglican dioceses in Ghana
Dioceses of the Church of the Province of West Africa
Dioceses in Ghana
Anglican bishops of Kumasi